Eurie Martin was a 58-year-old mentally ill African-American man killed by three Washington County, Georgia sheriff's deputies, on the evening of July 7, 2017.

Martin was walking along, or perhaps on, the road going from his home in Milledgeville toward Sandersville. In the all-White settlement of Deepstep, Georgia, he asked Cyrus Harris, a local resident, for water. Harris called 911. 

While attempting to arrest and handcuff Martin, the deputies used Taser devices against him fifteen times in less than five minutes. Video shows the policemen kneeling on Martin's shoulders, legs and waist holding the devices against his body until he stopped moving. Witnesses pointed out that two of the officers were obese.  

The three policemen were fired and charged with felony murder, involuntary manslaughter, false imprisonment, aggravated assault and reckless conduct. At the trial, experts testified that it was electrocution, not an underlying medical condition that caused Martin's death. Medical testimony showed Martin had no drugs in his system. The prosecution also produced witnesses that such a use of a Taser was not within the department's guidelines. 

The deputies had to justify the use of Tasers. They first said that Martin physically threatened him. But eyewitnesses said there were no threats, which was confirmed by the video. Without reasonable suspicion of a crime, Martin could legally resist being handcuffed.  

After Martin was motionless, the deputies tried to figure out a crime to charge him with, a discussion that was captured on video. They first mentioned trespassing, then changed it to walking on the road.

Deputies testified that Martin was walking on the road as they arrived, a crime that justified the arrest. The prosecution argued that it was a rural road with no sidewalk, and people commonly walked down the road.

Eyewitnesses Lee Curtis Bentley and Susan Steele testified the lawmen did not give aid to Martin when he was restrained. 

The officer's defense initially claimed the killing was covered by Georgia's Stand Your Ground law. This was disallowed. They then maintained their actions were in fact within the Sheriff's Office guidelines and that they were not trained in those guidelines.

On October 25, 2021, the jury asked to see the video of the incident again. They then sent the judge a note saying they were unable to reach a unanimous verdict. The judge then jury read the Allen charge encouraging them to continue deliberations. Two days later, a mistrial was declared.

References

2017 controversies in the United States
2017 in Georgia (U.S. state)
People killed by law enforcement officers in the United States
Washington County, Georgia
Law enforcement in Georgia (U.S. state)
Police brutality in the 2010s
Electroshock weapon controversies
African-American-related controversies
Deaths by electrocution
Taser